Toc Toc is a 2017 Spanish comedy film directed by Vicente Villanueva, starring Rossy de Palma, Paco León, Inma Cuevas, Oscar Martínez, Alexandra Jiménez, Adrián Lastra and Ana Rujas and distributed by Warner Bros. The film portrays a group of patients with obsessive–compulsive disorder (OCD). The film's title is a play on words in Spanish, with “toc” being both the onomatopoeia for “knock” and the abbreviation for OCD in Spanish (trastorno obsesivo compulsivo). It is the film adaptation of a French play by Laurent Baffie.

The film was shown during the summer of 2018 as part of the Cine de Verano in Seville, Spain.

Plot
The movie opens showing five people who manifest OCD in various ways and one person who has Tourette syndrome. Blanca has Contamination OCD. Thus, she avoids touching people or surfaces and, if unavoidable, uses antibiotic wipes or washes her hands. Ana Maria has checking OCD wherein she repeatedly checks the faucet, her keys, etc. Emilio is an arithmomaniac with compulsive hoarding who crunches numbers and hoards. Otto compulsively organizes and avoids stepping on lines and cracks. Lili has echolalia and palilalia wherein she repeats phrases others say as well as her own. Lastly, Federico has motor tics, copropraxia and coprolalia and makes obscene gestures and utters vulgar phrases.

Each think they have an appointment for a private session with a famous psychologist, but arrive to find others have appointments at the same time and that the doctor is delayed. While waiting for the doctor to arrive, they get to know each other and, finally, decide to do their own group therapy session.

The session is successful insofar as all the patients feel they have briefly overcome their compulsions and can build on that success. They agree to meet once a week on their own to continue working together. At the end, it is revealed that one of the "patients" is actually the doctor. As the credits roll, we see each of the patients making progress as they live their lives.

Cast

References

External links
 

2017 comedy films
Spanish comedy films
2017 films
2010s Spanish-language films
Films about obsessive–compulsive disorder 
Atresmedia Cine films
2010s Spanish films